The Rockland County Times is a weekly newspaper published in Rockland County, New York.

The Rockland County Times began publication in October 1889. In 1998 the paper declared bankruptcy and was purchased by Peter Sluys, a former editor of other weekly newspapers. The following year, the Rockland County Times was designated one of the official newspapers of Rockland County, for purposes of publication of legal notices and announcements.

In 2014 The paper was purchased by Dylan Skriloff, its editor. In 2020 it was purchased by John and Walter Sanchez, owners of The Queens Ledger / Greenpoint Star Weekly Newspaper Group in New York City. They also publish The Wave of Rockaway. The broadsheet paid weekly newspaper is published on Thursdays. Along with its mail subscriptions it is distributed at 115 locations throughout the county. The paper is published from its offices at 119 Main Street Nanuet and in 2022 is the only countywide paid weekly newspaper in Rockland County.

Robert J. Connor was a former columnist for the Rockland County Times. Since 2013, the paper's reporting has been sourced by People, CBS News, and Politico, among others.

References

Weekly newspapers published in the United States
1889 establishments in New York (state)